Eotrigonodon is an extinct genus of prehistoric bony fish.

See also

 Prehistoric fish
 List of prehistoric bony fish

References

Paleocene fish
Eocene fish
Paleogene fish of Asia
Paleogene fish of Europe